Luís Carlos Teixeira de Oliveira (born 25 November 1982, in Lisbon), known as Luís Carlos, is a Portuguese footballer who plays for União Desportiva Alta de Lisboa as an attacking midfielder.

External links

1982 births
Living people
Footballers from Lisbon
Portuguese footballers
Association football midfielders
Primeira Liga players
Liga Portugal 2 players
Segunda Divisão players
Lusitano G.C. players
F.C. Penafiel players
G.D. Estoril Praia players
Vitória F.C. players
C.F. Os Belenenses players
Portimonense S.C. players
G.D. Chaves players
C.D. Mafra players